The 2015 GP3 Series was the sixth season of the third-tier of Formula One feeder championship and also sixth season under the moniker of GP3 Series, a motor racing feeder series that was run in support of the  FIA Formula One World Championship and sister series GP2. Thirty-one drivers represented eight teams over the course of the season's nine rounds, starting in Spain on 9 May and ending in Abu Dhabi on 29 November. It was the final season for the Dallara GP3/13-AER P57 V6 chassis and engine package that debuted in 2013. A new Dallara-built chassis was introduced for 2016 along with a Mecachrome normally-aspirated V6 engine.

French driver Esteban Ocon (ART Grand Prix) finished the campaign as the drivers' champion after a season-long battle with Trident driver Luca Ghiotto. Despite winning only one race in 2015 – the first race in Barcelona – Ocon took fourteen podium finishes, including a run of nine successive runner-up placings over the mid-course of the season. Ocon ultimately finished eight points clear of Ghiotto, who won a season-high five races. Another five-time winner, Marvin Kirchhöfer, completed the championship top three, some fifty-three points behind team-mate Ocon. The performances of Ocon and Kirchhöfer were more than enough for ART Grand Prix to regain the teams' championship title they had missed out on for the first time in 2014. Five other drivers took race victories during the 2015 season; Arden International pairing Emil Bernstorff and Kevin Ceccon each took two victories, while Jimmy Eriksson, Álex Palou and Óscar Tunjo each took sprint race victories, which were held with partially-reversed grids – an inversion of the top eight finishers in the previous day's feature race.

Teams and drivers
The following teams competed in the 2015 season:

Driver changes

Changing teams
 Emil Bernstorff switched from Carlin to Arden International.
 Kevin Ceccon switched from Jenzer Motorsport to Arden International.
 Alfonso Celis Jr., who raced for Status Grand Prix switched to ART Grand Prix.
 Adderly Fong moved from Jenzer Motorsport to Koiranen GP.
 Alex Fontana left ART Grand Prix to join Status Grand Prix.
 Mitchell Gilbert and Jann Mardenborough, who raced for Trident and Arden International respectively in 2014, raced for Carlin.

Entering GP3
 2014 European Formula 3 Championship winner Esteban Ocon stepped up to the series with ART Grand Prix.
 Zaid Ashkanani, the 2014 Porsche GT3 Cup Challenge Middle East champion, moved into the series with Campos Racing.
 Aleksander Bosak graduated from the Formula Renault 2.0 Alps series, joining Arden International.
 Seb Morris stepped up to the series from Formula Renault 2.0 NEC, joining Status Grand Prix.
 Matt Parry graduated to the series with Koiranen GP, having competed in various Formula Renault series in 2014.
 ADAC Formel Masters driver Ralph Boschung graduated to the series with Jenzer Motorsport.
 Antonio Fuoco, who finished fifth in the 2014 European Formula 3 Championship, moved into the series – as a Ferrari Driver Academy member – with Carlin.
 The top three drivers from the 2014 Euroformula Open Championship competed in the GP3 Series in 2015. Sandy Stuvik, Artur Janosz and Álex Palou made their débuts with Status Grand Prix, Trident and Campos Racing respectively.
 2014 Formula Renault 3.5 Series driver Óscar Tunjo moved to the GP3 Series with Trident.

Leaving GP3
 2014 series champion Alex Lynn left the series to compete in GP2 with DAMS.
 2014 series runner-up Dean Stoneman left the series to compete in Formula Renault 3.5 with DAMS, after joining the Red Bull Junior Team.
 Kang Ling left the series to compete in the European Formula 3 Championship with kfzteile24 Mücke Motorsport.
Patric Niederhauser left the GP3 Series and moved to the Lamborghini Super Trofeo Europe with the Raton Racing team.
 Santiago Urrutia left the series to compete in the Pro Mazda Championship with Team Pelfrey.
 Robert Vișoiu left the series to compete in GP2 with Rapax.
 Dino Zamparelli left the series to compete in the Porsche Carrera Cup Great Britain with Parr Motorsport.
 Richie Stanaway left the series to compete in GP2 with Status Grand Prix.

Team changes
 Following the bankruptcy of the Marussia F1 team, Marussia Manor Racing decided to leave the GP3 Series. With no replacement team found, the number of teams competing in the 2015 season was reduced to eight.
 Campos Racing entered the series, replacing Hilmer Motorsport.

Calendar
In December 2014, the full 2015 calendar was revealed with nine events.

Calendar changes
 The series was scheduled to run in support of the German Grand Prix, at a venue that, at the time of the calendar's publication, had not yet been decided. With the cancellation of the German Grand Prix, the planned GP2 meeting was rescheduled to Bahrain International Circuit in the 2015 6 Hours of Bahrain weekend.

Results

Championship standings
Scoring system
Points were awarded to the top 10 classified finishers in the race 1, and to the top 8 classified finishers in the race 2. The pole-sitter in the race 1 also received four points, and two points were given to the driver who set the fastest lap inside the top ten in both the race 1 and race 2. No extra points were awarded to the pole-sitter in the race 2.

Race 1 points

Race 2 points
Points were awarded to the top 8 classified finishers.

Drivers' championship

Notes
† — Drivers did not finish the race, but were classified as they completed over 90% of the race distance.

Teams' championship

Footnotes

References

External links
 

GP3
GP3 Series seasons
GP3
GP3 Series